John van den Broek (1895 – 29 June 1918) was a Dutch born cinematographer. He is remembered primarily for his work on the films of Maurice Tourneur. Van den Broek died at 23 while filming the Tourneur directed film Woman in 1918. According to Tourneur's biographer Harry Waldman, Van den Broek was on a cliff in Maine filming some large waves when he got caught in a series of waves that carried him out to sea. His body was never recovered.

Partial filmography
The Wishing Ring (1914)
The Rail Rider (1916)
The Pride of the Clan (1917)
The Poor Little Rich Girl (1917)
The Undying Flame (1917)
The Law of the Land (1917)
Barbary Sheep (1917)
The Rise of Jennie Cushing (1917)
Rose of the World (1918)
The Blue Bird (1918)
Prunella (1918)
A Doll's House (1918)
The Sporting Life (1918)

References

External links

1890s births
1918 deaths
Dutch cinematographers
Mass media people from Rotterdam
Deaths by drowning in the United States
Accidental deaths in Maine